The 2023 season is Lion City Sailors' 28th consecutive season in the top flight of Singapore football and in the Singapore Premier League. They will play in the 2023–24 AFC Champions League, which marked their 4th appearance at the competition (including main play-offs), and their 2nd ACL Group Stage appearance, if qualified.

The female team will be playing in the Women's Premier League (Singapore).

Squad

Singapore Premier League 

Note 1: Pedro Henrique remained with the team but not registered for the SPL.

U21 squad

Mattar Sailors (SFL1) squad

Women squad (LCS)

Women squad (Mattar Sailors)

Coaching staff 
The following list displays the coaching staff of all the Lion City Sailors current football sections:

First Team

 Academy

Transfers

In 
Pre-season

Out 

Pre-season

Loan Returns 
Pre-season

Mid-season

Loans Out 
Pre-season

Mid-Season

Contract extensions

Friendlies

Pre-season friendlies

First Team

U21

Team statistics

Appearances and goals (LCS)

Appearances and goals (Women)

Competitions (LCS)

Overview
As of 12 August 2022

Singapore Premier League

Singapore Cup

AFC Champions League

Group stage

Competition (Women's Premier League)

Women's Premier League

League table

Competition (U21)

Stage 1
All 8 teams will be each other in a round robin format before breaking into 2 groups for another 3 matches. A total of 10 matches will be played thru the season.

 League table

Stage 2

 League table

Competition (U17)

U17 League

League table

Competition (SFL)

Singapore Football League D2

League table

See also 
 2010 Home United FC season
 2011 Home United FC season
 2012 Home United FC season
 2013 Home United FC season
 2014 Home United FC season
 2015 Home United FC season
 2016 Home United FC season
 2017 Home United FC season
 2018 Home United FC season
 2019 Home United FC season
 2020 Lion City Sailors FC season
 2021 Lion City Sailors F.C. season
 2022 Lion City Sailors F.C. season
 2022 Lion City Sailors Women season
 2023 Lion City Sailors Women

Notes

References 

Lion City Sailors F.C.
Lion City Sailors FC seasons
2023
1